Stray Islands is a scattered but distinct group of islands lying  west of Petermann Island, in the Wilhelm Archipelago off the Antarctic Peninsula. Mapped by the Falkland Islands Dependencies Survey (FIDS) from photos taken by Hunting Aerosurveys Ltd. in 1956-57 and from the helicopter of HMS Protector in March 1958. So named by the United Kingdom Antarctic Place-Names Committee (UK-APC) because the group is scattered.

See also 
 List of Antarctic and sub-Antarctic islands

Islands of the Wilhelm Archipelago